Caroline Bourgeois is a Canadian politician, who has been a Montreal City Councillor for the La Pointe-aux-Prairies ward in the borough of Rivière-des-Prairies–Pointe-aux-Trembles since 2009. She has served on the Montreal Executive Committee since June 2013.

She was first elected in the 2009 municipal election as a member of the Vision Montréal party, defeating incumbent councillor Nicolas Montmorency.

References

Montreal city councillors
Women in Quebec politics
Women municipal councillors in Canada
Living people
People from Rivière-des-Prairies–Pointe-aux-Trembles
Year of birth missing (living people)